Acacia brassii is a shrub belonging to the genus Acacia and the subgenus Juliflorae that is native to north eastern Australia.

Description
It has dark brown to grey coloured bark that is longitudinally fissured. Its dark red to brown coloured branchlets are glabrous or lightly haired and are flattened towards the apices and have scurfy ridges. Like most species of Acacia it has phyllodes rather than true leaves. The evergreen, coriaceous and mostly glabrous phyllodes have a lanceolate or narrowly ovate shape and are narrowed at both ends. It blooms between June and July producing golden flowers. The brown coloured seeds inside are arranged longitudinally and have a depressed cylindrical shape with a length of ..

Distribution
It is endemic to the northern part of Cape York Peninsula where it is quite common. It is found in deep sandy soils usually along creeks and rivers in scrubland communities often with Melaleuca viridiflora.

See also
List of Acacia species

References

brassii
Flora of Queensland
Taxa named by Leslie Pedley
Plants described in 1974